Cyperus simaoensis is a species of sedge that is native to southern parts of China.

See also 
 List of Cyperus species

References 

simaoensis
Plants described in 2001
Flora of China